Gabriela Zych (31 May 1941 – 10 April 2010) was a Polish activist.

She died in the 2010 Polish Air Force Tu-154 crash near Smolensk on 10 April 2010. She was posthumously awarded the Order of Polonia Restituta.

References

1941 births
2010 deaths
Polish activists
Knights of the Order of Polonia Restituta
Recipients of the Gold Cross of Merit (Poland)
Victims of the Smolensk air disaster